Big Brother 2022 is the second cooperation season of the Dutch and Belgian version of Big Brother. It is the eight regular version of Big Brother in both Belgium and the Netherlands. The show is broadcast on RTL5 in the Netherlands and Play4 in Belgium beginning on 3 January 2022. Live streams are available 24/7 on Videoland for Dutch viewers and on GoPlay.be and Telenet for Belgian viewers.

During the final of Big Brother 2021 the hosts already hinted Big Brother could return. Afterwards producers told they were researching the possibility of a sequel. On 29 June 2021, there was an announcement of the new season and a call for new housemates. The start and concept of the season was revealed at November 2021.

Geraldine Kemper and Peter Van de Veire return as co-hosts of the show. The house of the previous season remained but was completely restyled. The gameroom was extended and a shop added. The season was announced to be harder, more exciting and unexpected compared to the other season. The season was again plagued by the consequences of the COVID-19 pandemic: there was no live audience, housemates were tested, quarantined and Kemper was due to illness replaced for a few weeks by Bridget Maasland.

The eight first housemates arrived at New Year's Eve 2021. The first episode aired on 3 January 2022. The ratings of the launch dropped considerably compared to the previous revival season. The start had 586.000 viewers in the Netherlands at both RTL4 & RTL5, a drop of 56%, and 376.510 viewers at the Belgian Play4. The season got attention when Big Brother gave a warning racistic, discriminating and sexistic remarks or behaviour aren't tolerated and reminded the housemates about the zero tolerance. Housemate Nawel Seghairi was nominated eight times in a row by almost only male housemates. She gained a large fanbase outside but was eventually voted out close to the final. Many viewers protested against Kristof Timmermans winning a golden key to the final, more than two weeks for the final, saying the twist was fixed. The broadcasters denied Timmermans was being protected.

The final was on 26 March 2022 and the winner was Salar Abassi Abraasi who won the jackpot of €69,815.  The final was watched by 295.000 viewers in the Netherlands and 208.449 viewers in Belgium.

Production

Format 
Big Brother 2022 followed the same format as the previous season of the program. Housemates lived in isolation from the outside world in a custom-built house for a period of 100 days, hoping to be the last one to leave the house as the winner, and walk away with a large cash prize.

Concept
Producers of the reality show stated this season would be harder compared to the previous season, responding to complaints during the previous season. A promo was released showing the public being able to change the water temperature and moving the walls. This was not the case. However week themes were added, warm water was limited and the house did become smaller when it was divided in two.

Broadcasts 
The first episode was pre-recorded on the evening of 31 December 2021 and simultaneously broadcast on RTL4 and RTL5 in the Netherlands, Play4 on Belgium on 3 January 2022. The Daily show aired from Monday to Friday with the live show on Saturday night.

Housemates

Weekly summary 
The main events in the Big Brother house are summarised in the table below.

Episodes
<onlyinclude>

Nominations table

 Housemates from The Netherlands
 Housemates from Belgium

References

External links
 
 
 Dutch official website on RTL
 Belgian official website on Play4

08
Big Brother (franchise)
2020s Belgian television series
2020s Dutch television series
Belgian reality television series
Dutch reality television series
Dutch-language television shows